The islands of São Tomé and Príncipe were discovered and claimed by Portugal in the 1470s. A Portuguese colony was established in 1485. Each island was governed as a separate entity until 1753, when they were united as a single crown colony. In 1951, the islands became an overseas province of Portugal. Autonomy was granted in 1974 and independence was granted on 12 July 1975.

São Tomé

Portuguese Colony (1485–1522) 
 24 September 1485 – 3 February 1490 João de Paiva, Captain
 3 February 1490 – 29 July 1493 João Pereira, Captain
 29 July 1493 – 28 April 1499 Álvaro de Caminha, Captain
 11 December 1499 – c.1510 Fernão de Melo, Captain
 c.1510 – c.1516 ....
 c.1516 – c.1517 Diogo de Alcáçova, Captain
 c.1517–1522 João de Melo, Captain

Portuguese Crown Colony (1522–1641) 
 1522 – 15.. Vasco Estevens, Captain
 15.. – 1531 ....
 1531 – c.1535 Henrique Pereira, Captain
 c.1535–1541 Gonçalo Álvares, Governor
 1541–1545 Diogo Botelho Pereira, Captain
 1546 – c.1554 Francisco de Barros de Paiva, Captain
 c.1558 – 15.. Pedro Botelho, Captain
 15.. – 1560 Ana Chaves, Administrator
 1560–1564 Cristóvão Dória de Sousa, Captain
 1564–1569 Francisco de Gouveia, Captain
 1569–1571 Francisco de Pavia Teles, Captain
 1571–1575 Diogo Salema, Captain
 1575 – c.1582 António Monteiro Maciel, Captain
 c.1582 – c.1584 Ana Chaves, Administrator
 c.1584–1587 Francisco Fernandes de Figueiredo, Captain (from 1586, Governor)
 1587–1591 Miguel Teles de Moura, Governor
 1591–1592 Duarte Peixoto da Silva, Governor
 1592–1593 Francisco de Vila Nova, Acting Governor
 1593–1597 Fernandes de Meneses, Governor
 1597 – c.1598 Vasco de Carvalho, Governor
 c.1598–1601 João Barbosa da Cunha, Acting Governor
 1601–1604 António Maciel Monteiro, Acting Governor
 1604 – 160. Pedro de Andrade, Governor
 160. – 1609 João Barbosa da Cunha, Acting Governor
 1609 Fernando de Noronha, Governor
 1609–1611 Constantino Tavares, Governor
 1611 João Barbosa da Cunha, Acting Governor
 1611 Francisco Teles de Meneses, Governor
 1611–1613 Luís Dias de Abreu, Governor
 1613–1614 Feliciano Carvalho, Governor
 1614–1616 Luís Dias de Abreu, Governor
 1616–1620 Miguel Correia Baharem, Governor
 1620–1621 Pedro da Cunha, Governor
 1621–1623 Félix Pereira, Governor
 1623–1627 Jerónimo de Melo Fernando, Governor
 1627–1628 André Gonçalves Maracote, Governor
 1628–1632 Lourenço Pires de Távora, Acting Governor
 1632 Francisco Barreto de Meneses, Governor
 1632–1636 Lourenço Pires de Távora, Acting Governor
 1636 António de Carvalho, Governor
 1636–1640 Lourenço Pires de Távora, Acting Governor
 1640 Manuel Quaresma Carneiro, Governor
 1640–1641 Miguel Pereira de Melo e Albuquerque, Acting Governor

Dutch Occupation 
 3 October 1641 – 1648 .... (Dutch commander)

Portuguese Crown Colony (1648–1709) 
 1641–1642 Paulo da Ponte, Acting Governor
 1642 – c.1650 Lourenço Pires de Távora, Governor
 c.1650–1656 ....
 1656 – c.1657 Cristóvão de Barros do Rêgo, Governor
 c.1657 – c.1661 ....
 c.1661 – 166. Pedro da Silva, Governor
 166. – 1669 ....
 1669–1671 Paulo Ferreira de Noronha, Governor
 1671–1673 Chamber Senate
 1673–1677 Julião de Campos Barreto, Governor
 1677–1680 Bernardim Freire de Andrade, Governor
 1680–1683 Jacinto de Figueiredo e Abreu, Governor
 1683–1686 João Álvares da Cunha, Acting Governor
 1686 António Pereira de Brito Lemos, Governor
 1686–1689 Bento de Sousa Lima, Governor
 1689–1693 António Pereira de Lacerda, Governor
 1693–1694 António de Barredo, Governor
 1695–1696 José Pereira Sodré, Governor
 1696–1697 João da Costa Matos, Governor
 1697–1702 Manuel António Pinheiro da Câmara, Governor
 1702–1709 José Correia de Castro, Governor
 1709 Vicente Dinis Pinheiro, Governor

French Occupation (1709–1715) 
 1709–1715 Junta

Portuguese Crown Colony (1715–1753) 
 1715–1716 Bartolomeu da Costa Ponte, Governor
 1716–1717 Chamber Senate
 1717–1720 António Furtado Mendonça, Governor
 1720–1722 Junta
 1722–1727 José Pinheiro da Câmara, Governor
 1727–1734 Serafim Teixeira Sarmento, Governor
 1734–1736 Lopo de Sousa Coutinho, Governor
 1736–1741 José Caetano Soto Maior, Governor
 1741 António Ferrão de Castelo Branco, Governor
 1741–1744 Chamber Senate
 1744 Francisco Luís da Conceição, Governor
 1744–1745 Francisco de Alva Brandão, Acting Governor
 1747–1748 Francisco Luís das Chagas, Governor
 1748–1751 Chamber Senate
 1751 António Rodrigues Neves, Governor
 1751–1753 Chamber Senate

Príncipe 
 1500 – 3 April 1545: António Carneiro, seigneur de Vimioso
 3 April 1545 – 15??: Francisco de Alcaçova Carneiro
 15?? – 16??: Luís Carneiro 
 16?? – 1640: Francisco Carneiro 
 4 February 1640 –1690: Luís Carneiro de Sousa, comte de Principe
 1690 – 7 January 1708: Francisco Luís Carneiro de Sousa, comte de Principe
 7 January 1708 – 6 November 1724: António Carneiro de Sousa, comte de Principe
 6 November 1724 – 18 November 1731: Francisco Carneiro de Sousa, comte de Principe
 18 November 1731 – 29 November 1753: Carlos Carneiro de Sousa e Faro, comte de Principe
 1753 – 1851: Unknown
 1851 – 1852: Francisco Ferreira Coelho Cintra
 1852 – 1852: Manuel Francisco Landolph
 1852 – 1854: Manuel Mariano Ghira
 1854 – 1857: Joaquim José de Sousa Osório Menezes
 1857 – 1860: João Manuel de Melo
 1862 – 1862: João Filipe de Gouveia

São Tomé and Príncipe

Portuguese Crown Colony (1753–1951) 
 1753–1755 Chamber Senate
 1755 Lopo de Sousa Coutinho, Governor
 1755–1758 Chamber Senate
 1758–1761 Luís Henrique da Mota e Mele, Governor
 1761–1767 Chamber Senate
 1767–1768 Lourenço Lôbo de Almeida Palha, Governor
 1768–1770 Chamber Senate
 1770–1778 Vicente Gomes Ferreira, Governor
 1778–1782 João Manuel de Azambuja, Governor
 1782–1788 Cristóvão Xavier de Sá, Governor
 1788–1797 João Resende Tavares Leote, Governor
 1797 Inácio Francisco de Nóbrega Sousa Coutinho, Governor
 1797 Manuel Monteiro de Carvalho, Acting Governor
 1797–1798 Varela Borca, Governor
 1798–1799 Manuel Francisco Joaquim da Mota, Governor
 1799 Francisco Rafael de Castelo de Vide, Governor
 1799–1802 João Baptista de Silva, Governor
 1802–1805 Gabriel António Franco de Castro, Governor
 1805–1817 Luís Joaquim Lisboa, Governor
 1817–1824 Filipe de Freitas, Governor
 1824–1830 João Maria Xavier de Brito, Governor
 1830–1834 Joaquim Bento da Fonseca, Governor
 1834–1836 Provisional government
 1836–1837 Fernando Correia Henriques de Noronha, Acting Governor
 1837–1838 Leandro José da Costa, Governor
 1838–1839 José Joaquim de Urbanski, Governor
 1839–1843 Bernardo José de Sousa Soares de Andréa, Governor
 5 February 1843 – 2 March 1843 Leandro José da Costa, Governor
 2 March 1843 – 1 May 1846 José Maria Marquês, Governor
 1 May 1846 – 30 September 1847 Chamber Senate
 30 September 1847 – 20 November 1847 Carlos Augusto de Morais e Almeida, Governor
 20 November 1847 – 20 July 1848 Chamber Senate
 20 July 1848 – 30 June 1849 José Caetano René Vimont Pessoa, Governor
 12 December 1849 – 9 March 1851 Leandro José da Costa, Governor
 9 March 1851 – 20 March 1853 José Maria Marquês, Governor
 20 March 1853 – 28 July 1855 Francisco José da Pina Rolo, Governor
 28 July 1855 – 21 March 1857 Adriano Maria Passaláqua, Governor
 21 March 1857 – 15 January 1858 Chamber Senate
 15 January 1858 – 29 May 1858 Francisco António Correia, Governor
 29 May 1858 – 1859 Chamber Senate
 1859 – 21 November 1860 Luís José Pereira e Horta, Governor
 21 November 1860 – 8 July 1862 José Pedro de Melo, Governor
 8 July 1862 – 17 November 1862 Chamber Senate
 17 November 1862 – 30 March 1863 José Eduardo da Costa Moura, Governor
 30 March 1863 – 8 January 1864 João Baptista Brunachy, Governor
 8 January 1864 – 2 August 1865 Estanislau Xavier de Assunção e Almeida, Governor
 2 August 1865 – 30 July 1867 João Baptista Brunachy, Governor
 30 July 1867 – 30 September 1867 António Joaquim da Fonseca, Governor
 30 September 1867 – 30 May 1869 Estanislau Xavier de Assunção e Almeida, Governor
 30 May 1869 – 7 October 1872 Pedro Carlos de Aguiar Craveiro Lopes, Governor
 7 October 1872 – July 1873 João Clímaco de Carvalho, Governor
 28 October 1873 – 1 November 1876 Gregório José Ribeiro, Governor
 1 November 1876 – 28 September 1879 Estanislau Xavier de Assunção e Almeida, Governor
 28 September 1879 – 28 November 1879 Francisco Joaquim Ferreira do Amaral, Governor
 28 November 1879 – 3 January 1880 Custódio Miguel de Borja, Acting Governor, Governor
 3 January 1880 – 30 December 1881 Vicente Pinheiro Lôbo Machado de Melo e Almada, Governor
 30 December 1881 – 26 January 1882 Augusto Maria Leão, Acting Governor
 26 January 1882 – 24 May 1884 Francisco Teixeira da Silva, Governor
 24 May 1884 – 25 August 1886 Custódio Miguel de Borja, Governor
 25 August 1886 – 9 March 1890 Augusto César Rodrigues Sarmento, Governor
 9 March 1890 – 26 June 1891 Firmino José da Costa, Governor
 26 June 1891 – 8 December 1894 Francisco Eugénio Pereira de Miranda, Governor
 8 December 1894 – 8 April 1895 Jaime Lobo Brito Godins, Acting Governor
 8 April 1895 – 5 April 1897 Cipriano Leite Pereira Jardim, Governor
 5 April 1897 – 5 April 1899 Joaquim da Graça Correia e Lança, Governor
 5 April 1899 – 3 January 1901 Amâncio de Alpoim Cerqueira Borges Cabral, Governor
 3 January 1901 – 8 May 1901 Francisco Maria Peixoto Vieira, Acting Governor
 8 May 1901 – 8 October 1902 Joaquim Xavier de Brito, Governor
 8 October 1902 – 7 June 1903 João Abel Antunes Mesquita Guimarães, Governor
 7 June 1903 – 14 December 1903 João Gregório Duarte Ferreira, Acting Governor
 14 December 1903 – 13 April 1907 Francisco de Paula Cid, Governor
 13 April 1907 – 24 June 1907 Vitor Augusto Chaves Lemos e Melo, Acting Governor
 24 June 1907 – 24 October 1908 Pedro Berquó, Governor
 24 October 1908 – 13 March 1909 Vítor Augusto Chaves Lemos e Mel, Acting Governor
 13 March 1909 – 13 June 1910 José Augusto Vieira da Fonseca, Governor
 13 June 1910 – 7 August 1910 Jaime Daniel Leote do Rego, Governor
 7 August 1910 – 11 November 1910 Fernando Augusto de Carvalho, Governor
 12 November 1910 – 28 November 1910 Carlos de Mendonça Pimentel e Melo, Acting Governor
 28 November 1910 – 14 June 1911 António Pinto Miranda Guedes, Governor
 14 June 1911 – 24 December 1911 Jaime Daniel Leote do Rego, Governor
 24 December 1911 – 13 May 1913 Mariano Martins, Governor
 13 May 1913 – 31 May 1915 Pedro do Amaral Boto Machado, Governor
 31 May 1915 – 6 June 1915 José Dionísio Carneiro de Sousa e Faro, Governor
 6 June 1915 – 28 July 1918 Rafael dos Santos Oliveira, Acting Governor
 28 July 1918 – 11 June 1919 João Gregório Duarte Ferreira, Governor
 11 June 1919 – 25 September 1920 Avelino Augusto de Oliveira Leite, Governor
 25 September 1920 – 22 October 1920 José Augusto de Conceição Alves Vélez, Acting Governor
 22 October 1920 – 2 July 1921 Eduardo Nogueira de Lemos, Acting Governor
 2 July 1921 – 23 January 1924 António José Pereira, Governor
 23 January 1924 – 8 July 1926 Eugénio de Barros Soares Branco, Governor
 8 July 1926 – 31 August 1928 José Duarte Junqueira Rato, Governor
 31 August 1928 – 30 January 1929 Sebastião José Barbosa, Acting Governor
 30 January 1929 – 31 August 1929 Francisco Penteado, Governor
 31 August 1929 – 17 December 1933 Luís Augusto Vieira Fernandes, Governor
 17 December 1933 – 8 May 1941 Ricardo Vaz Monteiro, Governor
 8 May 1941 – 5 April 1945 Amadeu Gomes de Figueiredo, Governor
 5 April 1945 – July 1948 Carlos de Sousa Gorgulho, Governor
 July 1948 – 8 October 1950 Afonso Manuel Machado de Sousa, Acting Governor
 8 October 1950 – 11 June 1951 Mário José Cabral Oliveira Castro, Acting Governor

Overseas Province of Portugal (1951–1974) 
 11 June 1951 – 28 June 1952 Mário José Cabral Oliveira Castro, Acting Governor
 28 June 1952 – 18 April 1953 Guilherme António Amaral Abranches Pinto, Acting Governor
 18 April 1953 – 19 May 1953 Fernando Augusto Rodrigues, Acting Governor
 19 May 1953 – July 1953 Afonso Manuel Machado de Sousa, Acting Governor
 July 1953 – August 1954 Francisco António Pires Barata, Governor
 August 1954 – 15 June 1955 Luís da Câmara Leme Faria, Acting Governor
 15 June 1955 – 5 December 1956 José Machado, Acting Governor
 5 December 1956 – 13 October 1957 Octávio Ferreira Gonçalves, Acting Governor
 13 October 1957 – August 1963 Manuel Marques de Abrantes Amaral, Governor
 August 1963 – 30 October 1963 Alberto Monteiro de Sousa Campos, Acting Governor
 30 October 1963 – 1972 António Jorge da Silva Sebastião, Governor
 1973–1974 João Cecilio Gonçalves, Governor
 29 July 1974 – 18 December 1974 António Pires Veloso, Governor

Autonomous Province of Portugal (1974–1975) 
 18 December 1974 – 12 July 1975 António Pires Veloso, High Commissioner

See also
 Politics of São Tomé and Príncipe
 List of presidents of São Tomé and Príncipe
 List of prime ministers of São Tomé and Príncipe
 List of presidents of the Regional Government of Príncipe
 Ministry of Foreign Affairs, Cooperation and Communities

References

External links
 World Statesmen – São Tomé and Príncipe

Political history of Portugal
History of São Tomé and Príncipe
List
São Tomé and Príncipe